USS Holland (SS-1) was the United States Navy's first modern commissioned submarine, although not the first military submarine of the United States, which was the 1775 submersible Turtle. The boat was originally laid down as Holland VI at the Crescent Shipyard of Elizabeth, New Jersey for John Philip Holland's Holland Torpedo Boat Company, and launched on 17 May 1897. She was acquired by the USN on 11 April 1900 and commissioned on 12 October 1900, Lieutenant H. H. Caldwell commanding.

Design and construction

Holland was built at former Navy Lieutenant Lewis Nixon's Crescent Shipyard of Elizabeth, New Jersey for John Holland's Holland Torpedo Boat Company, which became the Electric Boat company in 1899. The vessel was built under the supervision of John Philip Holland, who designed the vessel and her details. Hollands keel was laid at Nixon's Crescent Shipyard with both men present. The two men worked together using many of John Holland's proven concepts and patents to make the submarine a reality, each man complementing the other's contributions to the development of the modern submarine. John Holland was the inventor for US Patent 702,729 for the design of a submarine boat. Testing and training first took place at the Holland Torpedo Boat Station from 1899 to 1900. Important contributions were also made by Arthur L. Busch (or Du Busc), Crescent's superintendent.

Holland VI included many features that submarines of the early 20th century would exhibit, albeit in later, more advanced forms. There was a conning tower from which the boat and her weapons could be directed. Also, she had all the necessary ballast and trim tanks to make precise changes in depth and attitude underwater.

For armament, she had a reloadable 18-inch (450 mm) torpedo tube with three Whitehead Mark 2 torpedoes and an  pneumatic dynamite gun in the bow (the dynamite gun's projectiles were called "aerial torpedoes"). A second dynamite gun in the stern was removed in 1900 to make room for an improved engine exhaust, prior to delivery to the Navy.

A 66-cell Exide battery powered the electric motor when submerged. This allowed speeds of  surfaced and  submerged. There is significant variation in references as to the vessel's horsepower and speed, for example the Register of Ships of the U. S. Navy gives horsepower figures of  surfaced and  submerged, with  surfaced and  submerged.

Service
Holland VI eventually proved her validity and worthiness as a warship and was ultimately purchased by the U.S. government for the sum of $150,000 on 11 April 1900. She was considered to be the first truly successful craft of her type. These became America's first fleet of underwater naval vessels.

Holland VI was modified after her christening, and was renamed United States Submarine Torpedo Boat Holland (Submarine-1) when she was commissioned by the US Navy on 12 October 1900, at Newport, Rhode Island, with Lieutenant Harry H. Caldwell in command.

During her commissioned life in the USN, the Holland did not carry the hull designation SS-1. The designation system currently in use was placed into Naval Regulations on 17 July 1920. Thus, the Holland would have never been assigned SS-1. She would have been designated Submarine-1 or simply S-1 under the system in place between 1895 and 1920. Most historians, including official Navy sources, have retroactively applied both the prefix USS and the designation SS-1 to avoid confusion.

Holland was the first commissioned submarine in the US Navy and is the first of the unbroken line of submarines in the Navy. She was the fourth submarine to be owned by the Navy, however. The first submarine was Propeller (also known as Alligator), the second was Intelligent Whale and the third was Plunger, an experimental submarine, built in 1895, which is not to be confused with USS Plunger (SS-2).

On 16 October 1900, in order to be kept serviceable throughout the winter, Holland left Newport under tow of the tug Leyden for Annapolis, Maryland, where she was used to train midshipmen of the United States Naval Academy, as well as officers and enlisted men ordered there to receive training vital in preparing for the operation of other submarines being built for the Fleet.

Holland proved valuable for experimental purposes in collecting data for submarines under construction or contemplation. Her  surface run, from Annapolis to Norfolk, Virginia from 8–10 January 1901, provided useful data on her performance underway over an extended period.

Holland (briefly in 1899, on trials) and five  Holland-type submarines were based in New Suffolk, New York on the North Fork of Long Island from 1899 to 1905, prompting the hamlet to claim to be the first submarine base in the United States.

Except for the period from 15 June to 1 October 1901, which was passed training cadets at the Naval Torpedo Station, Newport, Rhode Island, Holland remained at Annapolis as a training submarine until 17 July 1905 when she was decommissioned.

Holland finished her career in reserve at Norfolk, Virginia. Her name was struck from the Naval Vessel Register on 21 November 1910. This revolutionary submarine was sold as scrap to Henry A. Hitner & Sons of Philadelphia on 18 June 1913 for $100. Her purchaser was required to put up $5,000 bond as assurance that the submarine would be broken up and not used as a ship.

About 1915, the hulk of the Holland, stripped of her external fittings, was sold to Peter J. Gibbons.  As of October 1916 she was on display in Philadelphia. In May 1917 she was moved to the Bronx, New York as a featured attraction at the Bronx International Exposition of Science, Arts and Industries.

Holland was on display for several years in Paterson, New Jersey until she was finally scrapped in 1932.

See also
 History of submarines
 
  Royal Navy
 Submarines of the Imperial Japanese Navy

References

Bibliography

Further reading
 Listed under the heading of General Dynamics/Electric Boat Corporation.

 The US Navy's official submarine force newsletter. Article is about Arthur Busch/Du Busc and his key role in building America's (and Japan's) first submarines, circa 1896–1905. US Navy Submarine Force Library and Museum

Documents and letters written by John Philip Holland, Lewis Nixon and Elihu B. Frost, etc. archived and housed at the US Navy Submarine Force Library and Museum in New London, Connecticut

External links

 

 This site also contains information on Elihu B. Frost, Arthur L. Busch, Frank Cable, Lawrence York Spear, Isaac Rice etc.

 This site attempts to further explain the events that took place while John P. Holland's company was being formed.
DiGiulian, Tony Navweaps.com Dynamite Guns page
youtube.com USS Holland 
youtube.com Submarine #1  

Submarines of the United States Navy
Ships built in Elizabeth, New Jersey
1897 ships
John Philip Holland